Pseudodistomidae is a family of tunicates belonging to the order Aplousobranchia.

Genera:
 Anadistoma Kott, 1992
 Citorclinum Monniot & Millar, 1988
 Pseudodistoma Michaelsen, 1924

References

Aplousobranchia